Ernest Vincent Wright (1872October 7, 1939) was an American author known for his book Gadsby, a 50,000-word novel which, except for the introduction and a note at the end, did not use the letter "e".

Biography

The biographical details of his life are unclear. A 2002 article in the Village Voice by Ed Park said he might have been English by birth but was more probably American. The article said he might have served in the navy and that he has been incorrectly called a graduate of MIT. The article says that he attended a vocational high school attached to MIT in 1888 but there is no record that he graduated. Park said rumors that Wright died within hours of Gadsby being published are untrue.

In October 1930 Wright approached the Evening Independent newspaper and proposed it sponsor a blue lipogram writing competition, with $250 for the winner. In the letter, he boasted of the quality of Gadsby. The newspaper declined his offer.

A 2007 post on the Bookride blog about rare books says Wright spent five and a half months writing Gadsby on a typewriter with the "e" key tied down. According to the unsigned entry at Bookride, a warehouse holding copies of Gadsby burned down shortly after the book was printed, destroying "most copies of the ill-fated novel." The blog post says the book was never reviewed "and only kept alive by the efforts of a few avant-garde French intellos and assorted connoisseurs of the odd, weird and zany." The book's scarcity and oddness has seen copies priced at $4,000 by book dealers.

Wright completed a draft of Gadsby in 1936, during a nearly six-month stint at the National Military Home in California. He failed to find a publisher and used a self-publishing press to bring out the book.

Wright previously authored three other books: The Wonderful Fairies of the Sun (1896), The Fairies That Run the World and How They Do It (1903), and Thoughts and Reveries of an American Bluejacket (1918). His humorous poem, "When Father Carves the Duck", can be found in some anthologies.

Further reading

 .
 .

References

External links

 
 

1872 births
1939 deaths
20th-century American male writers
20th-century American novelists
American male novelists